The 2016 West Virginia gubernatorial election took place on November 8, 2016, to elect the Governor of West Virginia, concurrently with the 2016 U.S. presidential election, as well as elections to the United States Senate in other states and elections to the United States House of Representatives and various state and local elections. The primaries were held on May 10.

Incumbent Democratic Governor Earl Ray Tomblin was barred from running for a second full term. He had ascended to the governorship upon Joe Manchin's election to the Senate in 2010 and was elected to a full term in 2012. Under the West Virginia Constitution, a partial term counts toward the limit of two consecutive terms.

The Democratic candidate, Jim Justice, a coal and agriculture businessman, won the open seat narrowly with a plurality of the vote, despite Republican Donald Trump simultaneously winning West Virginia in a landslide during the presidential election. Justice defeated Republican state senator Bill Cole and former state senator Charlotte Pritt, who ran as a member of the Mountain Party.

Background
In November 2010, Democratic Governor Joe Manchin resigned after being elected to the U.S. Senate. Earl Ray Tomblin, the President of the West Virginia Senate, became Acting Governor and won a special election held in October 2011. He was re-elected to a full term in the regularly-scheduled 2012 election. Tomblin was ineligible to run for re-election as the Constitution of West Virginia limits Governors to two consecutive terms, regardless of whether they are full or partial terms. However, Governors are re-eligible after four years out of office.

After publicly speculating he would run for his former office, Manchin was considered a heavy favorite in the 2016 race. However, he announced on April 19, 2015, that he would be remaining in the Senate instead.

Democratic primary

Candidates

Declared
 Booth Goodwin, former United States Attorney for the Southern District of West Virginia
 Jim Justice, businessman
 Jeff Kessler, Minority Leader of the West Virginia Senate, former President of the West Virginia Senate and candidate for governor in 2011

Declined
 Glen Gainer III, West Virginia State Auditor and nominee for West Virginia's 1st congressional district in 2014
 Carte Goodwin, former U.S. Senator
 Mike Green, former state senator
 Walt Helmick, West Virginia Commissioner of Agriculture
 Joe Manchin, U.S. Senator and former Governor
 John Perdue, West Virginia State Treasurer and candidate for governor in 2011
 Doug Reynolds, State Delegate
 Doug Skaff, former State Delegate
 Natalie Tennant, West Virginia Secretary of State, candidate for governor in 2011 and nominee for the U.S. Senate in 2014 (running for re-election)
 Rick Thompson, West Virginia Secretary of Veterans Assistance, former Speaker of the West Virginia House of Delegates and candidate for governor in 2011

Polling
{| class="wikitable"
|- valign= bottom
! style="width:170px;"| Poll source
! style="width:170px;"| Date(s)administered
! class=small | Samplesize
! class=small | error
! style="width:100px;"| JimJustice
! style="width:100px;"| BoothGoodwin
! style="width:100px;"| JeffKessler
! Undecided
|-
|MetroNews
| align=center| April 22–May 2, 2016
| align=center| 315
| align=center| ± 4.0%
|  align=center| 32%
| align=center| 27%
| align=center| 23%
| align=center| 18%
|-
|Public Policy Polling
| align=center| April 29–May 1, 2016
| align=center| 637
| align=center| ± 3.9%
|  align=center| 37%
| align=center| 23%
| align=center| 19%
| align=center| 21%
|-
|West Virginia Veterans
| align=center| March 2–6, 2016
| align=center| 600
| align=center| ± 3.9%
|  align=center| 36%
| align=center| 20%
| align=center| 16%
| align=center| 28%
|-
|MetroNews
| align=center| February 11–16, 2016
| align=center| 208
| align=center| ± 4.9%
|  align=center| 32%
| align=center| 25%
| align=center| 23%
| align=center| 21%
|-
|Global Strategy Group^
| align=center| December 1–3, 2015
| align=center| 350
| align=center| ± 5.2%
|  align=center| 39%
| align=center| 13%
| align=center| 19%
| align=center| 21%

 ^ Indicates a poll taken for Jim Justice campaign.

Results

Republican primary

Candidates

Declared
 Bill Cole, President of the West Virginia Senate

Did not file
 Andrew Utterback, college student and candidate for Mayor of Pineville in 2014
 Edwin Vanover, former Bramwell Police Chief and Democratic candidate for House of Delegates in 2012

Declined
 Evan Jenkins, U.S. Representative
 David McKinley, U.S. Representative and candidate for governor in 1996 (running for re-election)
 Patrick Morrisey, Attorney General of West Virginia (running for re-election)
 Mary Lou Retton, Olympic gymnast
 Erikka Storch, State Delegate

Endorsements

Polling

Results

Mountain Party

Candidates

Declared
Charlotte Pritt, former Democratic State Delegate, former Democratic State Senator, write-in candidate for governor in 1992 and Democratic nominee for governor in 1996

Endorsements

Libertarian Party

Candidates

Declared
 David Moran, retired engineer and farmer

General election

Debates 
Complete video of debate, October 11, 2016 - C-SPAN

Predictions

Polling

→ Indicates an internal poll conducted by the West Virginia Republican Party for Bill Cole.

with Booth Goodwin

with Jeff Kessler

with Joe Manchin

 * Internal poll for Joe Manchin

Results

Maps

References

External links
Official campaign websites (Archived)
Jim Justice (D) for Governor
Bill Cole (R) for Governor
David Moran (L) for Governor
Charlotte Pritt (G) for Governor

2016
West Virginia
2016 West Virginia elections